The Austria Taekwondo Federation is the largest Taekwondo Association in Austria. It is a member of the Austrian Olympic Committee.

International competition

Austria Taekwondo Federation is a member of the European umbrella organization European Taekwondo Union as well as the World Association for World Taekwondo (WT).

On the part of the Austria Olympic Committee, the Austria Taekwondo Federation is the only Taekwondo Association authorized to send athletes to the Olympic Games.

References

External links
Official site

Taekwondo organizations
Taekwondo
National members of World Taekwondo
Taekwondo in Austria
National Taekwondo teams